The invasion of Iceland (codenamed Operation Fork) by the Royal Navy and Royal Marines occurred on 10 May 1940, during World War II. The invasion took place because the British government feared that Iceland would be used by the Germans, who had recently overrun Denmark, which was in personal union with Iceland and which had previously been largely responsible for Iceland's foreign policy. The Government of Iceland issued a protest, charging that its neutrality had been "flagrantly violated" and "its independence infringed".

At the start of the war, the UK imposed strict export controls on Icelandic goods, preventing profitable shipments to Germany, as part of its naval blockade. The UK offered assistance to Iceland, seeking co-operation "as a belligerent and an ally", but the Icelandic government refused and reaffirmed its neutrality. The German diplomatic presence in Iceland, along with the island's strategic importance, alarmed the UK government.

After failing to persuade the Icelandic government to join the Allies, the UK invaded on the morning of 10 May 1940. The initial force of 746 Royal Marines commanded by Colonel Robert Sturges disembarked at the capital Reykjavík. Meeting no resistance, the troops moved quickly to disable communication networks, secure strategic locations, and arrest German citizens. Requisitioning local transport, the troops moved to Hvalfjörður, Kaldaðarnes, Sandskeið, and Akranes to secure potential landing areas against the possibility of a German counterattack.

Background 

During 1918, after a long period of Danish rule, Iceland had become an independent state in personal union with the Danish king and with common foreign affairs. The newly initiated Kingdom of Iceland declared itself a neutral country without a defence force. The treaty of union allowed for a revision to begin during 1941 and for unilateral termination three years after that, if no agreement was made. By 1928, all Icelandic political parties were in agreement that the union treaty would be terminated as soon as possible.

On 9 April 1940, German forces began Operation Weserübung, invading both Norway and Denmark. Denmark was subdued within a day and occupied. On the same day, the British government sent a message to the Icelandic government, stating that the UK was willing to assist Iceland in maintaining its independence but would require facilities in Iceland to do so. Iceland was invited to join the UK in the war "as a belligerent and an ally." The Icelandic government rejected the offer. On the next day, 10 April, the Icelandic parliament, the Alþingi (or Althing), declared Danish King Christian X unable to perform his constitutional duties and assigned them to the government of Iceland, along with all other responsibilities previously performed by Denmark on behalf of Iceland.

With Operation Valentine on 12 April 1940, the British occupied the Faroe Islands. After the German invasion of Denmark and Norway, the British government became increasingly concerned that Germany would soon try to establish a military presence in Iceland. They felt that this would constitute an intolerable threat to British control of the North Atlantic. Just as importantly, the British were eager to obtain bases in Iceland for themselves to strengthen their Northern Patrol.

Planning 
As the military situation in Norway deteriorated, the Admiralty came to the conclusion that the UK could no longer do without bases in Iceland. On 6 May, Winston Churchill presented the case to the War Cabinet. Churchill maintained that if further negotiations with the Icelandic government were attempted, the Germans might learn of them and act first. A surer and more effective solution was to land troops unannounced and present the Icelandic government with a fait accompli. The War Cabinet approved the plan.

The expedition was organised hastily and haphazardly. Much of the operational planning was conducted en route. The force was supplied with few maps, most of poor quality, with one of them having been drawn from memory. No one in the expedition was fully fluent with the Icelandic language.

The British planned to land all of their forces at Reykjavík. There, they would overcome any resistance and defeat local Germans. To guard against a German counterattack by sea, they would secure the harbour and send troops by land to nearby Hvalfjörður. The British were also worried that the Germans might airlift troops, as they had done with great success in their Norwegian campaign. To guard against this, troops would drive east to the landing grounds at Sandskeið and Kaldaðarnes. Lastly, troops would be sent by land to the harbour at Akureyri and the landing ground at Melgerði in the north of the country.

The UK Naval Intelligence Division (NID) expected resistance from three possible sources. Local Germans, who were thought to have some arms, might resist or even attempt some sort of coup. In addition, a German invasion force might already be prepared or begun immediately after the British landings. The NID also expected resistance from the Reykjavík police, consisting of some 60 armed men. If by chance a Danish patrol vessel were present in Reykjavík, the Danish sailors might assist the defenders. This concern was needless, as the only Danish naval vessels abroad were in Greenland.

Operation Fork

Force Sturges 

On 3 May 1940, the 2nd Royal Marine Battalion in Bisley, Surrey received orders from London to be ready to move at two hours' notice for an unknown destination. The battalion had been activated only the month before. Though there was a nucleus of active service officers, the troops were new recruits and only partially trained. There was a shortage of weapons, which consisted only of rifles, pistols, and bayonets, while 50 of the marines had only just received their rifles and had not had a chance to fire them. On 4 May, the battalion received some modest additional equipment in the form of Bren light machine guns, anti-tank guns, and 2-inch mortars. With no time to spare, zeroing of the weapons and initial familiarisation shooting would have to be conducted at sea.

Assisting arms provided to the force consisted of two 3.7-inch mountain howitzers, four QF 2 pounder naval guns, and two 4-inch coastal defence guns. The guns were manned by troops from the artillery divisions of the Navy and the marines, none of whom had ever fired them. They lacked searchlights, communication equipment, and gun directors.

Colonel Robert Sturges was assigned to command the force. Aged 49, he was a highly regarded veteran of World War I, having fought in the battle of Gallipoli and the battle of Jutland. He was accompanied by a small intelligence detachment commanded by Major Humphrey Quill and a diplomatic mission managed by Charles Howard Smith. Excluding those, the invasion force consisted of 746 troops.

Journey to Iceland 

On 6 May, Force Sturges boarded trains for Greenock on the Firth of Clyde. To avoid drawing attention to itself, the force was divided into two different trains for the journey, but due to delays in rail travel, the troops arrived at the railway station in Greenock about the same time, losing the small degree of anonymity desired. Additionally, security had been compromised by a dispatch uncoded and by the time the troops arrived in Greenock, many people knew that the destination was Iceland.

Boarding commenced but was fraught with problems and delays. Departure was delayed until 8 May, and even then a large amount of equipment and supplies had to be left on the piers.

At 04:00 on 8 May, the cruisers departed for Iceland. The cruisers were not designed to transport a force of the size assigned to them, and conditions were cramped. Despite reasonably good weather, many of the marines developed severe seasickness. The voyage was used as planned for calibration and familiarisation with the newly acquired weapons. One of the newly recruited marines died by suicide en route. The voyage was uneventful otherwise.

Surprise is lost 

At 01:47, Icelandic time, on 10 May, HMS Berwick used its aircraft catapult to launch a Supermarine Walrus reconnaissance aircraft. The principal aim of the flight was to scout the vicinity of Reykjavík for enemy submarines, which the Naval Intelligence Division had convinced itself were operating out of Icelandic harbours.

The Walrus was given orders not to fly over Reykjavík but – either accidentally or as the result of a miscommunication – it flew several circles over the town, making considerable noise. At this time, Iceland possessed only passenger aircraft, which did not fly at night, so this unusual event awoke and alerted a number of people. Prime Minister of Iceland Hermann Jónasson was alerted about the aircraft, as were the Icelandic Police. The acting chief of police, Einar Arnalds, surmised that it most likely originated from a British warship bringing the expected new ambassador. This was correct, though it was not the whole story.

, the German consul, was also alerted to the aircraft. Suspecting what was about to happen, he drove down to the harbour with a German associate. With the use of binoculars, he confirmed his fears and then hurried back. At home, he arranged for the burning of his documents and tried unsuccessfully to reach the Icelandic foreign minister by telephone.

Down at the harbour 
At 03:40, an Icelandic policeman saw a small fleet of warships approaching the harbour, but could not discern their nationality. He notified his superior, who notified Einar Arnalds, the acting chief of police. The laws of neutrality to which Iceland had committed forbade more than three warships from a belligerent nation from making use of a neutral harbour at the same time. Any aeroplanes from such ships were forbidden from flying over neutral territorial waters. Seeing that the approaching fleet was about to violate Icelandic neutrality in two ways, Arnalds began to investigate. Down at the harbour, he viewed the ships for himself and decided they were probably British. He contacted the foreign ministry, which confirmed that he should go out to the fleet and announce to its commander that he was in violation of Icelandic neutrality. Customs officers were ordered to prepare a boat.

Meanwhile, marines on Berwick were being ordered aboard Fearless, which would take them to the harbour. The seasickness and inexperience of the troops were causing delays and the officers were becoming frustrated. Just before 05:00, Fearless, loaded with about 400 marines, began moving toward the harbour. A small crowd had assembled, including several policemen still waiting for the customs boat. The British consul had received advance notice of the invasion and was waiting with his associates to assist the troops when they arrived. Uncomfortable with the crowd, Consul Shepherd turned to the Icelandic police. "Would you mind ... getting the crowd to stand back a bit, so that the soldiers can get off the destroyer?" he asked. "Certainly," came the reply.

The Fearless started disembarking immediately once it docked. Arnalds asked to speak with the captain of the destroyer, but was refused. He then hastened to report to the Prime Minister, who ordered him not to interfere with the British troops and to try to prevent conflicts between them and Icelanders. Down at the harbour, some of the locals protested against the arrival of the British. One Icelander snatched a rifle from a marine and stuffed a cigarette in it. He then threw it back to the marine and told him to be careful with it. An officer arrived to scold the marine.

Operations in Reykjavík 
The British forces began their operations in Reykjavík by posting a guard at the post office and attaching a flyer to the door. The flyer explained in broken Icelandic that British forces were occupying the city and asked for co-operation in dealing with local Germans. The offices of Landssími Íslands (state telecommunication service), RÚV (broadcasting service), and the Meteorological Office were quickly occupied by the British to prevent news of the invasion from reaching Berlin.

Meanwhile, high priority was assigned to the capture of the German consulate. Arriving at the consulate, the British troops were relieved to find no sign of resistance and simply knocked on the door. Consul Gerlach opened, protested against the invasion, and reminded the British that Iceland was a neutral country. He was reminded, in turn, that Denmark had also been a neutral country. The British discovered a fire upstairs in the building and found a pile of documents burning in the consul's bathtub. They extinguished the fire and salvaged a substantial number of records.

The British had also expected resistance from the crew of Bahia Blanca, a German freighter which had hit an iceberg in the Denmark Strait and whose 62-man crew had been rescued by an Icelandic trawler. The Naval Intelligence Division believed the Germans were actually reserve crews for the German submarines they thought were operating out of Iceland. The unarmed Germans were captured without incident.

Outcome 

On the evening of 10 May, the government of Iceland issued a protest, charging that its neutrality had been "flagrantly violated" and "its independence infringed", noting that compensation would be expected for all damage done. The British promised compensation, favourable business agreements, non-interference in Icelandic affairs, and the withdrawal of all forces at the end of the war. In the following days, air defence equipment was deployed in Reykjavík and a detachment of troops sent to Akureyri. However, the initial invasion force was ill-equipped, only partially trained and insufficient to the task of occupation and defence of the island.

On 17 May, 4,000 additional troops of the Canadian Army arrived to relieve the marines. In July, elements of the 2nd Canadian Division and 3rd Canadian Division were landed. Commonwealth occupation forces eventually totalled 25,000 infantry with elements from the Royal Air Force, Royal Navy and Royal Canadian Navy. One year after the invasion, forces from the still officially neutral United States were stationed on the island by agreement with the Icelandic government, relieving the bulk of British ground forces. U.S. forces grew considerably after the US joined the war on 7 December 1941, reaching as many as 30,000 army, navy and air force personnel at any one time. The RAF and RCAF continued to operate from two Royal Air Force stations through to the end of the war.

The UK invaded to forestall a German occupation, to provide a base for naval and air patrols, and to protect merchant shipping lanes from North America to Europe. In this the invasion was successful. However, the presence of British, Canadian, and US troops had a lasting impact on the country. Foreign troop numbers in some years equalled 25 percent of the population or almost 50 percent of the native male population. Icelanders were and remain divided about the war and occupation – what is sometimes referred to as "blessað stríðið" or "the Blessed War". Some point to the subsequent economic revival, others to loss of sovereignty and social upheaval.

The occupation required the building of a network of roads, hospitals, harbours, airfields and bridges across the country, and this did have an enormous positive economic impact. However, the Icelanders severely censured the sexual relationships between troops and local women, which were causing considerable controversy and political turmoil.

In 1941, the Icelandic Minister of the Judiciary investigated "The Situation", and the police tracked 500+ women who had been having sex with the soldiers. Many were upset that the foreign troops were "taking away" women, friends, and family. During 1942 two facilities opened to house such women who had relations with the soldiers. Both closed within a year, after investigations determined that most liaisons were consensual. About 332 Icelandic women married foreign soldiers.

During the occupation, on 17 June 1944, Iceland declared itself a republic. The Keflavík Agreement signed during 1946 between the US and the Republic of Iceland stipulated that the American army would leave the country within six months, and Iceland would take possession of Keflavík Airport. This did not happen for decades, and a substantial US military presence remained in Iceland until 30 September 2006. At the end of hostilities most British facilities were given to the Icelandic government.

Although the British action was to forestall any risk of a German invasion, there is no evidence that the Germans had an invasion planned. There was, however, German interest in seizing Iceland. In a postwar interview, Walter Warlimont claimed that "Hitler definitely was interested in occupying Iceland prior to [British] occupation. In the first place, he wanted to prevent "anyone else" from coming there; and, in the second place, he also wanted to use Iceland as an air base for the protection of our submarines operating in that area".

After the British invasion, the Germans composed a report to examine the feasibility of seizing Iceland, proposed as Operation Ikarus. The report found that while an invasion could be successful, maintaining supply lines would be too costly and the benefits of holding Iceland would not outweigh the costs (there was, for instance, insufficient infrastructure for aircraft in Iceland).

See also 
 Ástandið, a term about the influence of British and U.S. soldiers on Icelandic women
 British occupation of the Faroe Islands
 Expansion operations and planning of the Axis Powers

Footnotes

Sources

Further reading

External links 
 "Franklin D. Roosevelt's message to Congress on the US occupation of Iceland", U.S. State Department (7 July 1941).

1940 in Iceland
Iceland
Articles containing video clips
Battle of the Atlantic
Iceland
British violations of the rights of neutral nations during World War II
Conflicts in 1940
Iceland in World War II
Iceland–United Kingdom military relations
Invasions by the United Kingdom
Invasions of Iceland
History of the Royal Marines
Military history of Iceland during World War II
Iceland
Iceland
World War II operations of the Western European Theatre
Military history of Canada during World War II
I
Arctic military operations of World War II